"Shaken, not stirred" is how Ian Fleming's fictional British Secret Service agent James Bond prefers his martini cocktail.

The catchphrase first appears in the novel Diamonds Are Forever (1956), though Bond himself does not actually say it until Dr. No (1958), where his exact words are "shaken and not stirred." In the film adaptations of Fleming's novels, the phrase is first uttered by the villain, Dr. Julius No, when he offers the drink in Dr. No (1962), and it is not uttered by Bond himself (played by Sean Connery) until Goldfinger (1964). It is used in numerous Bond films thereafter with the notable exceptions of You Only Live Twice (1967), in which the drink is wrongly offered as "stirred, not shaken", to Bond's response "Perfect", and Casino Royale (2006) in which Bond, after losing millions of dollars in a game of poker, is asked if he wants his martini shaken or stirred and snaps, "Do I look like I give a damn?"

Variations in the Bond novels and films

Novels
The earliest form of the "shaken, not stirred" motif appears in the first Bond novel, Casino Royale (1953). After meeting his CIA contact Felix Leiter for the first time, Bond orders a drink from a barman while at the casino.

The drink will later be referred to as a "Vesper", after the original Bond girl, Vesper Lynd. A Vesper differs from Bond's usual cocktail of choice, the martini, in that it uses both gin and vodka, Kina Lillet instead of vermouth, and lemon peel instead of an olive. In the same scene Bond gives more details about the Vesper, telling the same barman that vodka made from grain instead of potatoes makes the drink even better. Kina Lillet is no longer available, but can be approximated by using the sweeter Lillet Blanc along with a dash of Angostura Bitters. Another Kina (or quinine) apertif which has the bite and approximate flavour is Cocchi Americano. Russian and Polish vodkas were also always preferred by Bond if they were in stock. Although there is a lot of discussion on the Vesper, it is only ordered once throughout Fleming's novels and by later books Bond is ordering regular vodka martinis, though he also drinks regular gin martinis. In total, Bond orders 19 vodka martinis and 16 gin martinis throughout Fleming's novels and short stories.

Film
The American Film Institute honoured Goldfinger and the phrase on 21 July 2005 by ranking it #90 on a list of best movie quotes in the past 100 years of film.

Sean Connery
The shaken Martini is mentioned twice in the first Bond film Dr. No (1962). When Bond has presumably ordered a drink from room service to his hotel room, it is mixed by a waiter, who says "one medium dry vodka martini mixed like you said, sir, but not stirred." (A slice of lime was in the bottom of the glass.) Later, Dr. No presents Bond with a drink—"A medium dry vodka martini, lemon peel. Shaken, not stirred."

Bond did not vocally order one himself until Goldfinger (1964). In the 1967 film You Only Live Twice, Bond's contact, Dikko Henderson, prepares a martini for Bond and says, "That's, um, stirred not shaken. That was right, wasn't it?" To which Bond replies politely, "Perfect."

George Lazenby
In George Lazenby's only film as Bond, On Her Majesty's Secret Service, Bond never actually orders himself a drink, but when he meets Marc-Ange Draco for the first time, Draco tells his assistant, Olympe, to get a dry martini for Bond. Draco then adds, "Shaken, not stirred."

Roger Moore
Roger Moore's Bond never actually ordered one himself, but has one ordered for him several times, nonetheless. In the 1977 film The Spy Who Loved Me, Anya Amasova orders him one. In Moonraker, his drink is prepared by Manuela. In Octopussy, the title character (Maud Adams) herself greets Bond by mixing his drink.

Timothy Dalton
Timothy Dalton's Bond ordered his trademark Martini in each of his films. In The Living Daylights he and Kara arrive in Austria where he orders a martini "Shaken, not stirred" shortly after entering their hotel. For his second film, Licence to Kill he does not directly order it. Instead, he tells Pam Bouvier what drink he would like as he plays Blackjack, only to end up disappearing shortly after, leaving Bouvier to down the entire martini in one long gulp—much to her disgust.

Pierce Brosnan
In GoldenEye, Bond orders the drink in a casino while talking with Xenia Onatopp, and later, Zukovsky refers to Bond as a "charming, sophisticated secret agent. Shaken, but not stirred." In Tomorrow Never Dies, Paris Carver orders the drink for Bond after the two meet again after years apart. While Paris' choice of drink had changed, Bond's had not. In The World Is Not Enough, Bond orders the drink in Zukovsky's casino. In Die Another Day, Bond is coming back on a rather turbulent British Airways flight. The air hostess (played by Roger Moore's daughter Deborah) serves him his martini, to which Bond replies, "Luckily I asked for it shaken". Later in the film, when Bond travels to Gustav Graves' ice palace in Iceland, he orders another martini, sarcastically telling the bartender "Plenty of ice, if you can spare it."

Daniel Craig
The Vesper was reused in the 2006 film version of Casino Royale, while Bond is playing poker to defeat Le Chiffre. Daniel Craig's Bond ordered the drink, providing great detail about how it should be prepared. The other poker players order the Vesper as well, with Felix Leiter telling the bartender to "Keep the fruit" with his. Later, after Bond loses money to Le Chiffre, he orders another martini, but when the barman asks whether he would like it shaken or stirred, Bond snaps, "Do I look like I give a damn?"

In Quantum of Solace, the bartender on an aeroplane gives the precise recipe for the Vesper from Fleming's novel Casino Royale, which was a minor anachronism, since Kina Lillet was reformulated (removing the Kina) in 1986, 22 years before the film's production. Bond is purported to have drunk six of them.

In Skyfall, when talking to Bond girl Sévérine at a casino bar, the bartender is seen shaking Bond's martini before pouring it, to which Bond comments "perfect".

In  Spectre, Bond orders his signature drink in a mountaintop resort, only to be told to his disdain that he is at a health clinic and that the bar does not serve alcohol. Q instead orders Bond an unpleasant-looking green-coloured "prolytic digestive enzyme shake", and a disgusted Bond asks the barman "Do me a favour, will you? Throw that down the toilet. Cut out the middleman."

In  No Time to Die, Bond orders his signature drink Vodka Martini and drinks it with Paloma in honor of Felix Leiter. Paloma finishes the drink very quickly, to calm her nervousness.

Purpose of shaking

Biochemists and martini connoisseurs have investigated the difference between a martini shaken and a martini stirred. The Department of Biochemistry at the University of Western Ontario in Canada studied whether preparation of a martini affects its antioxidant capacity; the study found that the shaken gin martinis were able to break down hydrogen peroxide and leave only 0.072% of the peroxide, while the stirred gin martini left 0.157%. Thus a shaken martini has more antioxidants than a stirred one.

Andrew Lycett, an Ian Fleming biographer, believed that Fleming liked his martinis shaken, not stirred, because Fleming thought that stirring a drink diminished its flavour. Lycett also noted that Fleming preferred gin and vermouth for his martini. Fleming was a fan of martinis shaken by Hans Schröder, a German bartender.

Harry Craddock's Savoy Cocktail Book (1930) prescribes shaking for all its martini recipes. However, many bartenders stir any cocktail whose ingredients are all transparent—such as martinis, manhattans, and negronis—to maintain clarity and texture. Shaking a drink introduces air bubbles into the mixture and can chip off small pieces from the ice cubes when they hit each other or the wall of the shaker. Both of these factors lead to a cloudy appearance and a different texture compared with a stirred drink. However, when any ingredients are opaque (such as citrus juices, dairy, or eggs), changes in clarity and texture are less important.

Both shaking and stirring a drink with ice serve to chill and dilute the drink. Both techniques are equally effective, but shaking is much faster. Bartenders do not stir long enough to reach the matching temperature and dilution.

Some connoisseurs believe that shaking gin "bruises" the gin (gives it a slight bitter taste). Fleming's novel Casino Royale states that Bond "watched as the deep glass became frosted with the pale golden drink, slightly aerated by the bruising of the shaker," suggesting that Bond was requesting it shaken because of the vodka it contained. Prior to the 1960s, vodka was, for the most part, refined from potatoes (usually cheaper brands). This element made the vodka oily. To disperse the oil, Bond ordered his martinis shaken; thus, in the same scene where he orders the martini, he tells the barman about how vodka made from grain rather than potatoes makes his drink even better. Shaking is also said to dissolve the vermouth better, making it less oily tasting.

Properly called a Bradford, a shaken martini also appears cloudier than when stirred. This is caused by the small fragments of ice present in a shaken martini. This also brings into question the movie versions, which are never cloudy. Diluting the drink may be deliberate.

In "Stirred", an episode of The West Wing, President Josiah Bartlet disagrees with Bond in a conversation with his aide Charlie Young: "Shaken, not stirred, will get you cold water with a dash of gin and dry vermouth. The reason you stir it with a special spoon is so not to chip the ice. James is ordering a weak martini and being snooty about it."

Other 007 drinking habits
A general study of Bond's consumption of alcohol in the series of novels by Fleming was published by three scientists.

Spirits
Bond's drinking habits mirror those of his creator, Ian Fleming. Fleming, as well as Bond throughout the novels, had a preference for bourbon whiskey. Fleming himself had a fondness for gin, drinking as much as a bottle a day; however, he was converted to bourbon at the behest of his doctor who informed him of his failing health.

Otherwise, in the films James Bond normally has a fondness for vodka that is accompanied by product placement for a brand. For instance, Smirnoff was clearly shown in 1962's Dr. No and in 1997's Tomorrow Never Dies, in which Bond sits drinking a bottle while in his hotel room in Hamburg. Other brands featured in the films have included Absolut Vodka, Stolichnaya and Finlandia. In the film GoldenEye, Bond suggests cognac when offered a drink by M, who gives him bourbon instead, as it is her preference. The whiskey poured is in fact Jack Daniel's, which markets itself as a Tennessee Whiskey, which is legally a sub-category of bourbon—often distinguished from bourbon itself.

In Goldfinger, Bond drinks a mint julep at Auric Goldfinger's Kentucky stud farm, and in Thunderball, Largo gives Bond a Rum Collins. Bond is also seen in Quantum of Solace drinking bottled beer when meeting with Felix Leiter in a Bolivian bar. The following Bond movies of Craig's tenure show Bond's preferred beer to be Heineken. In Die Another Day, Bond drinks a mojito. In Casino Royale, Bond orders Mount Gay Rum with soda. In that film, he also invents the famous "Vesper" cocktail—a variation on a martini—originally included in the novel but not seen in the films until the reboot. In Skyfall, the villain Raoul Silva says he believes 50-year-old Macallan single malt whisky to be one of Bond's favourites.

Also in Goldfinger during a briefing on the villain, their host offers a refill with, "Have a little more of this rather disappointing brandy."

M replies, "Why, what is the matter with it?"

Bond replies, "I'd say it was a 30-year-old Fine [as in Fine brandy] indifferently blended, Sir... with an overdose of Bon bois." Bon bois is a Cognac region known for its poor soils. It is a low quality Cognac, and Bond is saying that too much of this was used in the blend.

In the novel Moonraker, it is noted in the card club Blades, Bond adds a single pinch of black pepper to his glass of fine Wolfschmidt vodka, much to M's consternation, to which Bond says he got into the habit in joints that served villainous home brew. It sinks all the poisons to the bottom, and Bond got to like the taste. However, he does admit that he should not have insulted the Club Wolfschmidt.

Wines

In the book Casino Royale, Bond describes Taittinger champagne as "not a well-known brand, but it is probably the finest champagne in the world."

In several of the Bond films, he is known to prefer Bollinger and Dom Pérignon champagne.
Never primarily a red wine drinker, Bond tended to favour Château Mouton Rothschild; a 1947 vintage in Goldfinger, and half a bottle On Her Majesty's Secret Service, a 1934 ordered by M in Moonraker, and a '55 in Diamonds are Forever—where Bond unveiled the assassin Wint posing as a waiter because the latter did not know that Mouton-Rothschild is a claret. In the Jeffery Deaver novel Carte Blanche, Bond expresses a knowledge and appreciation of South African wine.

In the film of Diamonds Are Forever, Bond savours a glass of sherry and fools M into thinking Bond has made a mistake when he pronounces a year of make (51"). When Bond is informed that sherry has no vintage, he replies (to a non-plussed M) that he was discerning the vintage of the wine on which the sherry is based—1851.

Others

Tiger, his host, is impressed and tells Bond he is exceptionally cultured—for a European. In Licence to Kill when in the dive bar called Barrelhead Bar, he orders the same as his contact, Pam Bouvier, a "Bud with a lime."

Aside from alcoholic beverages, Bond is a coffee drinker and eschews tea with a passion, believing it to have been a factor in the fall of the British Empire and referring to it as "a cup of mud" (in Fleming's Goldfinger). In the novel Live and Let Die, he expresses his fondness for Jamaican Blue Mountain Coffee—while in the film adaptation he is shown operating a La Pavoni Europiccola lever coffee machine in the kitchen of his flat. In the Fleming novel From Russia With Love he is shown to own a Chemex Coffeemaker and prefers his coffee brewed that way, while in the film version he orders coffee "very black" for breakfast from his hotel's room service; in Kerim Bey's office he asks for his Turkish coffee "medium sweet" as it is customary to specify the level of sweetness when ordering. He also accepts a cup, refusing cream or sugar, from Franz Sanchez in Licence to Kill—whereas in Moonraker he refuses a cup of tea offered by Hugo Drax. In The Living Daylights, Bond tastes a cup of café coffee he is served in the Prater Amusement Park, Vienna, making a face when it is not up to his standards.

See also
 Outline of James Bond
 Drinking culture

References

External links
 "Shaken and Stirred, James Bond Loves His Booze" at Time.com.

Catchphrases
Cocktails with vodka
James Bond
Quotations from literature
Quotations from film
Drinking culture
1950s neologisms